Yau Ma Tei Typhoon Shelter is a typhoon shelter located near Yau Ma Tei, Kowloon, Hong Kong.

History
The Government of Hong Kong planned for the construction of a second typhoon shelter after (the old) Causeway Bay Typhoon Shelter in late 1906. In 1908 the Public Works Department decided to construct the typhoon shelter at Yau Ma Tei. Works on the typhoon shelter lasted from 1910 to 1915. The cost was HK$2.21 million. The typhoon shelter was officially opened by Sir Francis Henry May, then Governor of Hong Kong, on 16 December 1915.

The Yau Ma Tei Boat People settled in the shelter from around 1916 to 1990.

The West Kowloon Reclamation Project began in 1990 as part of the Airport Core Programme, which required a replacement for the original typhoon shelter. The new typhoon shelter was built to the west of the original one, and was completed in 1992.

Housing estates built on the reclaimed land of the initial typhoon shelter include: Park Avenue, Charming Garden and Hoi Fu Court.

To improve the water quality of the typhoon shelter, construction of dry weather flow interceptor at Cherry Street box culvert started on 19 December 2017, and it is expected to be completed at the end of 2022.

See also
 1908 Hong Kong typhoon
 List of typhoon shelters in Hong Kong

References

External links

 

Yau Ma Tei
Typhoon shelters in Hong Kong
Victoria Harbour